The Prague Manifesto is a 1944 document of several members of the Committee for the Liberation of the Peoples of Russia to overthrow Joseph Stalin and establish a Nazi-allied government in Russia.

Prague Manifesto may also refer to:

 Prague Manifesto, (1521), written by Thomas Müntzer
 Prague Manifesto (SPD), (1934) document of Rudolf Hilferding demanding revolutionary change in Germany to overthrow fascism
 Manifesto of Prague, (1996) principles of the Esperanto movement drafted at the World Congress of Esperanto